Vonleh is a surname. Notable people with the surname include:

 Blahsue Vonleh (1865–1947), Liberian politician
 Noah Vonleh (born 1995), American basketball player